Gasba or tamja is a musical style based on a wind instrument of the same name, (gasba literally means "reed" in the Berber language), which is widespread in Tunisia, Algeria (among Chawis of north-east Algeria and Oran in the northwest), and in Morocco, (in the eastern Rif (Al Hoceima, Driouch, Nador, Berkane) Oujda, Beni Mathar and Bouarfa and by Jilala brotherhood).

External links
 Abdelkader Ben Mouiha, Jilala of Fes. Some recordings of the ancient repertoire of Jilala brotherhood, 1994:   
 Virtual museum

References

Maghreb
Tunisian music
Algerian music
Moroccan music